Wilkins is a plumbing parts manufacturing company based in California, United States.

History
James Wilkins started it in a 200 square foot garage in Los Angeles. 

In 1906 the company was purchased by Zurn.

Growth
Wilkins has grown to a 162,000 square foot manufacturing facility in Paso Robles, California. 

With over 160 employees and is now a part of the Rexnord family of companies. 

Wilkins has received the Rexnord Business Excellence Award two years in a row.

External links
Plumbing & Drain Services

Plumbing materials companies
Manufacturing companies based in California
Companies based in San Luis Obispo County, California
Paso Robles, California